The Ozamiz–Pagadian Road, also known as Aurora–Ozamis Road, is a  two-to-four lane road network connecting the cities of Ozamiz in Misamis Occidental and Pagadian in Zamboanga del Sur. It traverses through Tangub and the municipality of Bonifacio at Misamis Occidental and the municipalities of Tambulig, Molave, Ramon Magsaysay, and Aurora at Zamboanga del Sur.

The entire highway is designated as National Route 78 (N78) of the Philippine highway network.

References 

Ozamiz
Roads in Misamis Occidental
Roads in Zamboanga del Sur